Zakučac Hydroelectric Power Plant is a large power plant in Croatia that has four turbines with a nominal capacity of 122 MW each having a total capacity of 488 MW.

It is a high-pressure diversion plant located at the Cetina River mouth into the sea, near the city of Omiš.

It is operated by Hrvatska elektroprivreda.

References

Hydroelectric power stations in Croatia
Buildings and structures in Split-Dalmatia County
Omiš